Piapot is a hamlet within the Rural Municipality of Piapot No. 110, Saskatchewan, Canada. Listed as a designated place by Statistics Canada, the hamlet had a population of 50 in the Canada 2016 Census.

Once a thriving community, it has seen a steady decline since the 1950s and in the present day it resembles a ghost town. The hotel and saloon closed in 2006 but reopened in May 2008, embracing western heritage and culture. The Piapot Saloon and Guesthouse offers an escape from everyday life in the spirit of the original settlers as well as a gift shop and old western saloon. The only other business that is open to the public is the post office.

Demographics 

See also 

 List of communities in Saskatchewan
 List of hamlets in Saskatchewan
List of place names in Canada of Indigenous origin
 Piapot

References 

Piapot No. 110, Saskatchewan
Former villages in Saskatchewan
Designated places in Saskatchewan
Hamlets in Saskatchewan
Division No. 4, Saskatchewan